David Pressman (born 1977) is an American lawyer who has served as the United States ambassador to Hungary since 2022. He previously worked in the Obama administration and served as the United States ambassador to the United Nations for Special Political Affairs from 2014 to 2016. Pressman represented the United States at the United Nations Security Council and in related negotiations.

As an attorney in private practice, he has represented a wide variety of businesses while also representing the interests of human rights advocates, victims of terrorism, dissidents and journalists targeted by authoritarian regimes, and those unjustly convicted.

Biography
David Pressman was born in 1977 and grew up in California. His parents were both lawyers, one of them a judge. The family is Jewish with roots in Eastern Europe. Pressman received his Bachelor of Arts from Brown University in 1999.

He worked briefly in communications for the Clinton administration before becoming an aide to United States Secretary of State Madeleine K. Albright, accompanying her to the United Nations and Camp David and on several international trips. Entering law school in the fall of 2001, he got his Juris Doctor from New York University School of Law in 2004, where he graduated magna cum laude and a member of the Order of the Coif. 

During the 2004 presidential race, he served on Wesley Clark's National Security Working Group and then worked for the Kerry/Edwards campaign. He then clerked for the Supreme Court of Rwanda, where he evaluated post-genocide transitional justice initiatives. Returning to the US he worked at the Southern Poverty Law Center in Montgomery, Alabama. He also undertook an assignment in Sudan for the UN.

In early 2006, Pressman accompanied actor George Clooney and his father on a trip to Dafur to make a documentary. He joined Clooney on several missions to Europe, Asia, the Middle East and Africa to lobby for peace in Darfur. Pressman joined Clooney in founding Not On Our Watch Project, an advocacy and grant-making organization focused on raising awareness about mass-atrocities. Working as an attorney in private practice, he represented the Indian activist Leonard Peltier in seeking a pardon and had a conviction overturned in the case of a man who spent 10 years in prison for a crime he did not commit.

Obama administration
Under President Barack Obama, Pressman served as an assistant secretary in the Department of Homeland Security (DHS) and was responsible for policy development on global criminal justice issues there. He also served as the Director for War Crimes and Atrocities on the National Security Council, where he coordinated the government's efforts to prevent and respond to mass atrocities, genocide, and war crimes. He was also a member of the Atrocities Prevention Board.

On June 16, 2014, Obama nominated Pressman to be US Ambassador to the United Nations for Special Political Affairs–a role the New York Times has called both "the alternate" and "the deputy" US ambassador to the UN–and he was confirmed by the Senate on September 17, 2014. While waiting for Senate confirmation he served as counselor to Ambassador Samantha Power.

In early 2015, he successfully lobbied against a Russia-led attempt to deny benefits to the same-sex partners of U.N. employees. He participated in negotiations that produced sanctions against North Korea in March 2016 in response to that country's fourth nuclear test and placed the issue of human rights in North Korea on the agenda of the U.N. Security Council. As a spokesperson for the US, he praised the lifting of sanctions against Liberia as evidence of their success and denounced the failure of Sudanese authorities to take advantage of the support provided by the international community.

The day after a mass shooting at a gay nightclub in Florida in June 2016, Pressman told the UN General Assembly that denouncing terrorism was an insufficient response: "If we are united in our outrage by the killing of so many — and we are — let us be equally united around the basic premise of upholding the universal dignity of all persons regardless of who they love, not just around condemning the terrorists who kill them." He was influential in winning UN Security Council approval of a resolution that condemned "targeting persons as a result of their sexual orientation". It was the first time that body addressed sexual orientation and required what diplomats called "intense consultations" to overcome the reservations of countries that provide no civil protections for sexual orientation or criminalize homosexuality.

In private practice 
Pressman left government service in November 2016. He became the first executive director of George and Amal Clooney's family foundation, the Clooney Foundation for Justice, and he joined the law firm of Boies, Schiller & Flexner as a partner in their New York City office. Managing partner Jonathan D. Schiller described his role as a "statesman-litigator": "He advises clients on navigating political and legal issues in cross-border deals, disputes with foreign governments, national security-related issues and public law disputes." His clients at Boies included Epic Games Inc., the New York Yankees Partnership, and Centene Corp. In June 2020 he moved to Jenner & Block, again as a partner based in New York City, where his clients included Princeton University, First Republic Bank, and the Oshkosh Corp. 

Pressman was on Jenner's team of attorneys suing Russian banks in U.S. federal court in case over Russia's downing of a Malaysian Airlines flight in 2014. He worked on behalf of Lt. Col. Alexander S. Vindman in seeking corrections from Fox News and sued Saudi Crown Prince Mohammed bin Salman on behalf of Saad Aljabri, a former Saudi intelligence official. In 2021, he negotiated for the release of two Americans held for three years by China on charges they claimed were designed to pressure their father to return to China to face trial for financial crimes.

In October 2018, Pressman protested the U.S. State Department's new policy that denied visas to the same-sex partners of foreign employees of international institutions like the United Nations and the World Bank unless they were married. The State Department said the policy change was designed "to help ensure and promote equal treatment" between straight and gay couples". Pressman called it "creative and cynical way to use the expansion of equality at home to vindictively target same-sex couples abroad", given that many of them were denied the right to marry in their home countries.

Appointment as Ambassador to Hungary 
On May 13, 2022, President Joe Biden announced his intent to nominate Pressman to be United States ambassador to Hungary. On May 17, 2022, his nomination was sent to the Senate. Hearings on his nomination were held before the Senate Foreign Relations Committee on June 23, 2022, and the committee favorably reported his nomination to the Senate floor on July 19, 2022. During Pressman's confirmation hearing, a rubber boat was seen in the Danube River near the embassy in Budapest carrying a sign written in English and Hungarian, "Mr. Pressman, don't colonize Hungary with your cult of death". A photo of the protest is now displayed behind his embassy desk. On July 28, 2022, his nomination was confirmed in the Senate by a 61–30 vote. He was sworn in on August 8, 2022, and presented his credentials to President Katalin Novák on September 14, 2022. He is the first US ambassador to Hungary in years who was not appointed for being a political donor.

Personal life
Pressman, who is gay, is married and has twin sons.

See also
Ambassadors of the United States

Notes

References

1977 births
Living people
21st-century American diplomats
21st-century American Jews
21st-century American lawyers
Ambassadors of the United States to Hungary
Brown University alumni
Jewish American attorneys
New York University School of Law alumni
People associated with Jenner & Block
Gay diplomats
LGBT ambassadors of the United States